Kitwanga station is a railway station in Kitwanga, British Columbia. It is on the Canadian National Railway mainline and serves as a flag stop for Via Rail's Jasper–Prince Rupert train.

Footnotes

External links 
Via Rail Station Description

Via Rail stations in British Columbia